Didier Sénac (born 2 October 1958 in Saint-Denis, Seine-Saint-Denis) is a French former footballer who played as a defender. He obtained three international caps for the France national team during the early 1980s. A player of RC Lens (1977–1988), he was a member of the France national team that won the gold medal at the 1984 Summer Olympics in Los Angeles, California.

Clubs
 RC Lens (1977–1988)
 Girondins de Bordeaux (1988–1995)
 Toulouse FC (1995–1996)
 US Créteil (1996–1998)

External links
 
 
 French Football Federation Profile 

1958 births
Living people
Sportspeople from Saint-Denis, Seine-Saint-Denis
French footballers
France international footballers
Association football defenders
Olympic footballers of France
Olympic gold medalists for France
Footballers at the 1984 Summer Olympics
RC Lens players
FC Girondins de Bordeaux players
Toulouse FC players
US Créteil-Lusitanos players
Ligue 1 players
Ligue 2 players
French football managers
Olympic medalists in football
Medalists at the 1984 Summer Olympics
Footballers from Seine-Saint-Denis